is a Japanese sprinter. He competed in the 4 × 400 m relay event at the 2012 Summer Olympics.

Personal best

International competition

References

External links

Hiroyuki Nakano at JAAF 

Japanese male sprinters
1988 births
Living people
People from Anjō
Olympic athletes of Japan
Athletes (track and field) at the 2012 Summer Olympics
Universiade medalists in athletics (track and field)
Universiade silver medalists for Japan
Medalists at the 2011 Summer Universiade
Aichi University of Education alumni
20th-century Japanese people
21st-century Japanese people